Noord-Scharwoude (West Frisian: Noôrd-Skerwou) is a village in the municipality of Dijk en Waard in the province of North Holland, Netherlands.

History 
The village was first mentioned in 1094 as Bernardeskercha. The current name means "northern forest belonging to Schoorl". Noord (north) was added to distinguish from Zuid-Scharwoude. Noord-Scharwoude developed in the 11th century as a linear settlement on a dike. 

The Catholic John the Baptist church is a three aisled basilica-like church built between 1905 and 1906 as a replacement of an 1856 church.

Noord-Scharwoude was home to 634 people in 1840. It was a separate municipality between 1817 and 1941, when the new municipality Langedijk was created. There used to be a tram line to Alkmaar which was used to transport vegetables to the auction in the village. In 1934, the tram line closed and was reconstructed as a road. The auction no longer exist, and has been converted in apartment buildings. In 2022, Noord-Scharwoude became part of the new municipality of Dijk en Waard.

Gallery

See also
Scharwoude, Langendijk

References

External links

Former municipalities of North Holland
Populated places in North Holland
Geography of Dijk en Waard